Ron Blair (born 1942) is an Australian writer. Among his best known works is the play The Christian Brothers. He helped establish the now defunct Nimrod Theatre in Sydney in 1970, that operated until 1988. He was also the Assistant Director of the South Australian Theatre Company from 1976 until 1978

Biography
Born in Sydney in 1942, Blair attended Christian Brothers' High School, Lewisham. While studying for a bachelor of arts at the University of Sydney, he was involved in student performances by the Sydney University Dramatic Society. Early in his career he worked for ABC Radio. A freelance writer, he has written over a dozen plays. He is married to actress and director Jennifer Hagan (born Perth, 1943).

Select credits
Flash Jim Vaux (1971) (musical theatre) – writer 
President Wilson in Paris (1973) (play) – writer
The Christian Brothers (1975) (play) – writer
Mad, Bad and Dangerous to Know (1976) (monodrama) – writer
Last Day in Woolloomooloo (1979) (play) – writer
Marx (1982) (play) – writer
The Dismissal (1983) (mini series) – writer

References

External links
Ron Blair at IMDb
Ron Blair at AustLit
Ron Blair at AusStage

Australian writers
Living people
1942 births
Australian male dramatists and playwrights